Artem Vitaliyovych Smirnov (born 2 February 1988) is a Ukrainian tennis player playing on the ATP Challenger Tour.

Career
On 9 May 2016, he reached his highest ATP singles ranking of World No. 226, whilst his highest doubles ranking of 159 was reached on 23 August 2010.

He also played for the Ukraine Davis Cup team.

Challenger finals

Singles: 1 (0–1)

Doubles: 4 (1–3)

References

External links
 
 
 
 

1988 births
Living people
Ukrainian male tennis players
Universiade medalists in tennis
Universiade silver medalists for Ukraine
Universiade bronze medalists for Ukraine
Medalists at the 2009 Summer Universiade
21st-century Ukrainian people